Falsomesosella nigronotata is a species of beetle in the family Cerambycidae. It was described by Maurice Pic in 1930.

Subspecies
 Falsomesosella nigronotata hakka Gressitt, 1937
 Falsomesosella nigronotata nigronotata Pic, 1930

References
2. Falsomesosella picture

nigronotata
Beetles described in 1930